Ossuccio is a comune (municipality) in the Province of Como in the Italian region Lombardy.

It is known for the Sacro Monte, a site of pilgrimage and worship close to it, for the late 16th century Villa del Balbiano , the mid-20th century Villa Leoni , and for the island of Comacina which falls within its territory.

Ossuccio borders the following municipalities: Colonno, Lenno, Lezzeno, Ponna, Porlezza, Sala Comacina.

The Comune di Ossuccio will be united to Mezzegra, Lenno and Tremezzo to form a single municipality named Tremezzina: the new administration will be formalized after election of the Major on 25 May 2014

Demographic evolution

References

Cities and towns in Lombardy
Tremezzina